Psychotria acutiflora is a species of plant in the family Rubiaceae. It is endemic to Ecuador.

References

Flora of Ecuador
acutiflora
Data deficient plants
Taxonomy articles created by Polbot